The 1963 Baltimore Orioles season involved the Orioles finishing fourth in the American League with a record of 86 wins and 76 losses.

Offseason 
 November 21, 1962: Jimmie Coker purchased by the Orioles from the Philadelphia Phillies.
 November 26, 1962: Paul Blair was drafted by the Orioles from the New York Mets in the 1962 first-year draft.
 November 26, 1962: Curt Motton was drafted by the Orioles from the Chicago Cubs in the 1962 minor league draft.
 November 26, 1962: Gus Triandos and Whitey Herzog were traded by the Orioles to the Detroit Tigers for Dick Brown.
 December 15, 1962: Jack Fisher, Jimmie Coker and Billy Hoeft were traded by the Orioles to the San Francisco Giants for Stu Miller, Mike McCormick, and John Orsino.
 January 14, 1963: Hoyt Wilhelm, Ron Hansen, Dave Nicholson, and Pete Ward were traded by the Orioles to the Chicago White Sox for Luis Aparicio and Al Smith.
 Prior to 1963 season: Ron Stone was signed as an amateur free agent by the Orioles.

Regular season

Season standings

Record vs. opponents

Notable transactions 
 April 29, 1963: Curt Blefary was selected off waivers by the Orioles from the New York Yankees as a first-year waiver pick.
 May 8, 1963: Hobie Landrith was purchased from the Orioles by the Washington Senators.
 May 15, 1963: Bobby Darwin was selected off waivers by the Orioles from the Los Angeles Angels as a first-year waiver pick.

Roster

Player stats

Batting

Starters by position 
Note: Pos = Position; G = Games played; AB = At bats; H = Hits; Avg. = Batting average; HR = Home runs; RBI = Runs batted in

Other batters 
Note: G = Games played; AB = At bats; H = Hits; Avg. = Batting average; HR = Home runs; RBI = Runs batted in

Pitching

Starting pitchers 
Note: G = Games pitched; IP = Innings pitched; W = Wins; L = Losses; ERA = Earned run average; SO = Strikeouts

Other pitchers 
Note: G = Games pitched; IP = Innings pitched; W = Wins; L = Losses; ERA = Earned run average; SO = Strikeouts

Relief pitchers 
Note: G = Games pitched; W = Wins; L = Losses; SV = Saves; ERA = Earned run average; SO = Strikeouts

Awards and honors 
All-Star Game
Luis Aparicio, shortstop, starter
Steve Barber, reserve
Brooks Robinson, reserve

Farm system 

LEAGUE CHAMPIONS: Stockton, Bluefield

Notes

References 

1963 Baltimore Orioles team page at Baseball Reference
1963 Baltimore Orioles season at baseball-almanac.com

Baltimore Orioles seasons
Baltimore Orioles season
Baltimore Orioles